Paul J. Miles (born March 25, 1952) is a former American football running back.

Miles was born in 1952 and attended Paulding High School in Paulding, Ohio. He played college football at Bowling Green from 1971 to 1973. He was the third running back in NCAA history to have three seasons of 1,000 or more rushing yards: 1,185 yards as a sophomore; 1,024 yards as a junior; and 1,031 yards as a senior. He was rated by the Associated Press at the end of the 1973 season as the greatest running back in the history of the Mid-America Conference. Also at the end of the 1973 season, Bowing Green retired his jersey (No. 29), the first player in school honor to be so honored. While attending Bowling Green, he also played the guitar and sang in a folk-rock style in a one-man nightclub act. He was inducted into the Bowling Green Athletic Hall of Fame in 1990.

Miles was drafted in the eighth round of the 1974 NFL Draft by the Baltimore Colts. He played professionally in the World Football League for the Memphis Southmen during the 1974 season

References

1952 births
Living people
Toronto Argonauts players
Memphis Southmen players
Bowling Green Falcons football players
Players of American football from Ohio
Players of American football from Winston-Salem, North Carolina
People from Paulding, Ohio